is a Japanese violinist. She is the second daughter of retired oboe player Fumiaki Miyamoto.

Discography

Singles

Albums

Notes

References

External links 
  

Japanese violinists
Sony Music Entertainment Japan artists
1983 births
Living people
Musicians from Tokyo
Toho Gakuen School of Music alumni
21st-century violinists
Fantasy on Ice guest artists